Shira Yalon-Chamovitz (born 8 November 1962) is an Israeli occupational therapist. She is the director of the Israel Institute on Cognitive Accessibility and dean of students at Ono Academic College. 

She has made significant contributions to the field of accessibility for people with cognitive disabilities, having coined the terms "cognitive ramps" and "simultaneous simplification".

Biography
Shira Yalon-Chamovitz is married to Daniel Chamovitz, an American-born plant geneticist and the seventh president of Ben-Gurion University of the Negev in Beer-Sheva.

Academic career 
Most of Yalon-Chamovitz's research has concerned adults with cognitive disabilities. During her doctoral research, she developed a video test of practical intelligence which was included in the DSM-5 for the diagnosis of intellectual disability. Subsequent research looked into the application of virtual reality for individuals with physical and intellectual disabilities, and the use of co-teaching models in service learning in occupational therapy education.

Yalon-Chamovitz published a theoretical model of practice for cognitive accessibility. This model has become the basis for subsequent models and implementation.

Based on this model, Yalon-Chamovitz developed the "Simultaneous Simplification" technique, which was first implemented globally during the Eurovision Song Contest 2019. The Israeli Public Broadcasting Corporation provided cognitive accessibility to the broadcast of the Eurovision through a digital video live stream, which involved translating what was said in real time in English into plain language Hebrew.

Yalon-Chamovitz was a member of the committee that wrote the 2015 Israeli accessibility regulations which legally mandated the use of simple language and/or language simplification (Hebrew = פישוט לשוני).

References 

21st-century scientists
1962 births
The Hebrew University-Hadassah Medical School alumni
Living people
Israeli Jews
Occupational therapists
People from Jerusalem
Academic staff of Ono Academic College